Furio Scarpelli (16 December 1919 – 28 April 2010), also called Scarpelli, was  an Italian screenwriter, famous for his collaboration on numerous Commedia all'italiana films with Agenore Incrocci, forming the duo Age & Scarpelli.

He was the son of  journalist Filiberto Scarpelli. During his childhood he devoted himself to writing and drawing. During World War II, he started to work as an illustrator for satire magazines, together with Federico Fellini and Ettore Scola, and he met Agenore Incrocci, better known as "Age". 

Furio was born and died in Rome, Italy.

In 1949, he started his famous collaboration with Age as the duo Age & Scarpelli, writing some of the first Totò successes until 1952.

Together with Age, he worked on a total of 120 Italian movies. These include some of the most famous of all, such as Sergio Leone's  The Good, the Bad and the Ugly and Mario Monicelli's I soliti ignoti. After closing his relationship with Age, he wrote several movies with Ettore Scola, and the first works of directors such as Francesca Archibugi and Paolo Virzì. His third Nomination to Oscar was for  Il Postino: The Postman, written with his son Giacomo. He also taught at the Centro Sperimentale di Cinematografia. The film Tormenti (2011), adapted from his graphic novel, was released shortly after his death.

Awards
 Leone d’Oro per il film La grande guerra (1959)
 Nastro d'Argento per il film I soliti ignoti (1959)
 Oscar Nomination dell'Academy of Motion Picture Arts and Sciences per il film I Compagni (1964)
 Oscar Nomination dell'Academy of Motion Picture Arts and Sciences per il film Casanova '70 (1965)
 Nastro d'Argento per il film Sedotta e abbandonata (1965)
 Nastro d'Argento per il film Signore e signori (1967)
 Nastro d'Argento per il film C'eravamo tanto amati (1975)
 David di Donatello per il film Romanzo popolare (1975)
 Nastro d'Argento per il film La Terrazza (1980)
 Premio Cannes per la sceneggiatura de La Terrazza (1980)
 Premio Flaiano - Pegaso d'Oro alla carriera (1980)
 Ciak d'Oro per il film La Famiglia (1986)
 Nastro d'Argento per il film La Famiglia (1987)
 David di Donatello per il film La Famiglia (1987)
 Oscar Nomination dell'Academy of Motion Picture Arts and Sciences per il film Il Postino (1995)
 Nomination della British Academy of Film and Television Arts per il film Il Postino (1995)
 David di Donatello per il film Celluloide (1996)
 Globo d'Oro per il film Celluloide (1996)
 Ciak d'Oro per il film Testimone a rischio (1997)
 Grolla d'Oro per il film La Cena (1999)
 Nomination della European Film Awards per il film "Concorrenza Sleale (2001)
 Premio Flaiano - Pegaso d'Oro per il film Concorrenza Sleale (2001)
 Premio Elsa Morante ragazzi per Opopomoz (2004)
 Grolla d'Oro per il film La buona battaglia - Don Pietro Pappagallo (2006)
 Premio Flaiano - Pegaso d'Oro per il film La buona battaglia - Don Pietro Pappagallo (2006)

 Filmography 
 Tormenti - Film disegnato, regia di Filiberto Scarpelli (2011)
 Christine Cristina, regia di Stefania Sandrelli (2010)
 N (Io e Napoleone), regia di Paolo Virzì (2006)
 Baciami piccina, regia di Roberto Cimpanelli (2006)
 La buona battaglia - Don Pietro Pappagallo, regia di Gianfranco Albano (2006) (TV)
 Opopomoz, regia di Enzo D'Alò (2003)
 Concorrenza sleale, regia di Ettore Scola (2001)
 La cena, regia di Ettore Scola (1998)
 La missione, regia di Maurizio Zaccaro (1998) (TV)
 Ovosodo, regia di Paolo Virzì (1997)
 Altri uomini, regia di Claudio Bonivento (1997)
 Porzûs, regia di Renzo Martinelli (1997)
 Testimone a rischio, regia di Pasquale Pozzessere (1996)
 Un inverno freddo freddo, regia di Roberto Cimpanelli (1996)
 Celluloide, regia di Carlo Lizzani (1995)
 Il postino, regia di Michael Radford (1994)
 Per amore o per amicizia, regia di Paolo Poeti (1993) (TV)
 Cattiva, regia di Carlo Lizzani (1991)
 Il viaggio di Capitan Fracassa, regia di Ettore Scola (1990)
 Briganti, regia di Marco Modugno (1990)
 Tempo di uccidere, regia di Giuliano Montaldo (1989)
 La famiglia, regia di Ettore Scola (1987)
 Soldati - 365 all'alba, regia di Marco Risi (1987)
 Maccheroni, regia di Ettore Scola (1985)
 Figlio mio infinitamente caro, regia di Valentino Orsini (1985)
 Scemo di guerra, regia di Dino Risi (1985)
 Un ragazzo e una ragazza, regia di Marco Risi (1984)
 Cuori nella tormenta, regia di Enrico Oldoini (1984)
 Il tassinaro, regia di Alberto Sordi (1983)
 Ballando ballando, regia di Ettore Scola (1983)
 Spaghetti House, regia di Giulio Paradisi (1982)
 Nudo di donna, regia di Nino Manfredi (1981)
 Camera d'albergo, regia di Mario Monicelli (1981)
 I seduttori della domenica, regia di Bryan Forbes, Edouard Molinaro, Dino Risi, Gene Wilder (1980)
 La terrazza, regia di Ettore Scola (1980)
 Temporale Rosy, regia di Mario Monicelli (1980)
 Cocco mio, regia di Jean-Pierre Rawson (1979)
 Dove vai in vacanza?, regia di Mauro Bolognini, Luciano Salce, Alberto Sordi (1978)
 Doppio delitto, regia di Steno (1977)
 Basta che non si sappia in giro, regia di Nanni Loy, Luigi Magni, Luigi Comencini (1976)
 Signore e signori, buonanotte, regia di Luigi Comencini, Nanni Loy, Luigi Magni, Mario Monicelli, Ettore Scola (1976)
 La donna della domenica, regia di Luigi Comencini (1975)
 C'eravamo tanto amati, regia di Ettore Scola (1974)
 Romanzo popolare, regia di Mario Monicelli (1974)
 Teresa la ladra, regia di Carlo Di Palma (1973)
 Vogliamo i colonnelli, regia di Mario Monicelli (1973)
 Senza famiglia, nullatenenti cercano affetto, regia di Vittorio Gassman (1972)
 In nome del popolo italiano, regia di Dino Risi (1971)
 Brancaleone alle crociate, regia di Mario Monicelli (1970)
 FBI - Francesco Bertolazzi investigatore (1970) Miniserie TV
 Rosolino Paternò, soldato..., regia di Nanni Loy (1970)
 Dramma della gelosia - Tutti i particolari in cronaca, regia di Ettore Scola (1970)
 Quel negozio di Piazza Navona (1969) Miniserie TV
 Riusciranno i nostri eroi a ritrovare l'amico misteriosamente scomparso in Africa?, regia di Ettore Scola (1968)
 Straziami, ma di baci saziami, regia di Dino Risi (1968)
 Capriccio all'italiana, regia di Mauro Bolognini, Mario Monicelli, Pier Paolo Pasolini, Steno, Pino Zac, Franco Rossi (1968)
 Il tigre, regia di Dino Risi (1967)
 Le streghe, regia di Mauro Bolognini, Vittorio De Sica, Pier Paolo Pasolini, Franco Rossi, Luchino Visconti (1967)
 Il buono, il brutto, il cattivo, regia di Sergio Leone (1966)
 I nostri mariti, regia di Luigi Filippo D'Amico, Luigi Zampa, Dino Risi (1966)
 L'armata Brancaleone, regia di Mario Monicelli (1966)
 Io, io, io... e gli altri, regia di Alessandro Blasetti (1966)
 Signore & signori, regia di Pietro Germi (1966)
 Casanova '70, regia di Mario Monicelli (1965)
 Frenesia dell'estate, regia di Luigi Zampa (1964)
 I complessi, regia di Dino Risi, Franco Rossi, Luigi Filippo D'Amico (1964)
 Sedotta e abbandonata, regia di Pietro Germi (1964)
 I mostri, regia di Dino Risi (1963)
 I compagni, regia di Mario Monicelli (1963)
 Il maestro di Vigevano, regia di Elio Petri (1963)
 La marcia su Roma, regia di Dino Risi (1962)
 Mafioso, regia di Alberto Lattuada (1962)
 Il commissario, regia di Luigi Comencini (1962)
 Totò e Peppino divisi a Berlino, regia di Giorgio Bianchi (1962)
 A cavallo della tigre, regia di Luigi Comencini (1961)
 I due nemici, regia di Guy Hamilton (1961)
 Tutti a casa, regia di Luigi Comencini (1960)
 Audace colpo dei soliti ignoti, regia di Nanni Loy (1960)
 Il principe fusto, regia di Maurizio Arena (1960)
 Il mattatore, regia di Dino Risi (1960)
 Risate di gioia, regia di Mario Monicelli (1960)
 La grande guerra, regia di Mario Monicelli (1959)
 Policarpo, ufficiale di scrittura, regia di Mario Soldati (1959)
 La legge è legge, regia di Christian-Jaque (1958)
 I soliti ignoti, regia di Mario Monicelli (1958)
 Le fatiche di Ercole, regia di Pietro Francisci (1958)
 March's Child, regia di Antonio Pietrangeli (1958)
 Totò, Peppino e le fanatiche, regia di Mario Mattoli (1958)
 Souvenir d'Italie, regia di Antonio Pietrangeli (1957)
 Padri e figli, regia di Mario Monicelli (1957)
 Il medico e lo stregone, regia di Mario Monicelli (1957)
 Casta diva, regia di Carmine Gallone (1956)
 Il bigamo, regia di Luciano Emmer (1956)
 La banda degli onesti, regia di Camillo Mastrocinque (1956)
 Peccato di castità, regia di Gianni Franciolini (1956)
 Tempo di villeggiatura, regia di Antonio Racioppi (1956)
 Racconti romani, regia di Gianni Franciolini (1955)
 Bravissimo, regia di Luigi Filippo D'Amico (1955)
 Don Camillo e l'onorevole Peppone, regia di Carmine Gallone (1955) (non accreditato)
 Le signorine dello 04, regia di Gianni Franciolini (1955)
 Totò e Carolina, regia di Mario Monicelli (1955)
 Casa Ricordi, regia di Carmine Gallone (1954)
 Tempi nostri, regia di Alessandro Blasetti (1954)
 Ridere! Ridere! Ridere!, regia di Edoardo Anton (1954)
 Symphony of Love, regia di Glauco Pellegrini (1954)
 Una pelliccia di visone, regia di Glauco Pellegrini (1954)
 Villa Borghese, regia di Vittorio De Sica, Gianni Franciolini (1953)
 Ivan (il figlio del diavolo bianco), regia di Guido Brignone (1953)
 Cinema d'altri tempi, regia di Steno (1953)
 Napoletani a Milano, regia di Eduardo De Filippo (1953)
 Saluti e baci, regia di Maurice Labro, Giorgio Simonelli (1953)
 The Enchanting Enemy, regia di Claudio Gora (1953)
 What Scoundrels Men Are!, regia di Glauco Pellegrini (1953)
 I tre corsari, regia di Mario Soldati (1952)
 A fil di spada, regia di Carlo Ludovico Bragaglia (1952)
 Don Lorenzo, regia di Carlo Ludovico Bragaglia (1952)
 Il Segreto delle tre punte, regia di Carlo Ludovico Bragaglia (1952)
 Ragazze da marito, regia di Eduardo De Filippo (1952)
 Totò a colori, regia di Steno (1952)
 Totò e le donne, regia di Steno, Mario Monicelli (1952)
 Una bruna indiavolata, regia di Carlo Ludovico Bragaglia (1951)
 O.K. Nerone, regia di Mario Soldati (1951)
 Cameriera bella presenza offresi..., regia di Giorgio Pastina (1951)
 Totò terzo uomo, regia di Mario Mattoli (1951)
 Milano miliardaria, regia di Marino Girolami, Marcello Marchesi, Vittorio Metz (1951)
 Arrivano i nostri, regia di Mario Mattoli (1951)
 Auguri e figli maschi!, regia di Giorgio Simonelli (1951)
 Sette ore di guai, regia di Vittorio Metz, Marcello Marchesi (1951)
 Signori, in carrozza!, regia di Luigi Zampa (1951)
 Toto the Sheik, regia di Mario Mattoli (1950)
 Totò Tarzan, regia di Mario Mattoli (1950)
 Figaro Here, Figaro There, regia di Carlo Ludovico Bragaglia (1950)
 I cadetti di Guascogna, regia di Mario Mattoli (1950)
 The Merry Widower, regia di Mario Mattoli (1950)
 47 morto che parla, regia di Carlo Ludovico Bragaglia (1950)
 È arrivato il cavaliere, regia di Mario Monicelli, Steno (1950)
 Toto Looks for a Wife, regia di Carlo Ludovico Bragaglia (1950)
 Totò cerca casa, regia di Steno, Mario Monicelli (1949)
 Totò le Mokò, regia di Carlo Ludovico Bragaglia (1949)
 Vivere a sbafo'', regia di Giorgio Ferroni (1949)

Notes

External links

1919 births
2010 deaths
David di Donatello winners
Ciak d'oro winners
Italian male screenwriters
20th-century Italian screenwriters
Writers from Rome
Cannes Film Festival Award for Best Screenplay winners